The Reformed Churches in Brazil (Igrejas Reformadas do Brazil in Portuguese) is a federation of confessional Reformed churches in  northestern Brazil, started by Canadian and Dutch missionaries in the 1970s.

Origin
The Canadian and American Reformed Churches began missionary work in the villages between Recife and Maceio in 1970. In the same year Dutch Reformed Churches began missions in Paraná. This efforts led the formation of 2 churches in Alagoas and Pernambuco. The American missionaries are supported by two Brazilian Presbyterian students. The Canadian Reformed Church in Surrey, British Columbia was responsible for this work in Brazil. A school in Maceio was organised by the Reformed Church.

Other churches joined the federation from Dutch Reformed (in Colombo), baptist (Esperanca Church was formerly baptist) and Pentecostal origin ( the church in Cabro Frio was Pentecostal). The denomination has an official theological seminary, the John Calvin Institution (Institutio Joao Calvino) and offers Bachelor of Divinity to train national pastors, elders and deacons. From its beginning from a few congregations the denomination has congregations in several Brazilian cities and states.

Doctrine

Creeds
Apostles Creed
Nicene creed
Athanasius Creed

Confessions
Heidelberg Catechism
Belgic Confession
Canons of Dort

Churches
Congregations are in:
Alagoas:
Reformed Church in Maceio 
Reformed Church in Maragogi 
Ceará:
Reformed Church in Fortaleza
Minas:
Reformed Church in Unai
Paraiba:
Reformed Church in Esperanca
Paraná: 
Reformed Church in Colombo
Pernambuco:
Reformed Church in San Jose 
Reformed Church in Recife
Reformed Church in Caruaru
Reformed Church in Prazeres
Reformed Church in Veracruz
Reformed Church in Paulista
Rio de Janeiro: 
Reformed Church in Cabro Frio

Interchurch organisations
Igrejas Reformadas do Brasil has a sisterchurch relationship with the Canadian and American Reformed Churches. It is also a member of the International Conference of Reformed Churches.

References

External links
Igrejas Reformadas do Brasil - Official website
Maranatha Mission Blog

Reformed denominations in South America
Protestantism in Brazil